

0–9
1.96
2SLS (two-stage least squares) redirects to instrumental variable
3SLS – see three-stage least squares
68–95–99.7 rule
100-year flood

A

A priori probability
Abductive reasoning
Absolute deviation
Absolute risk reduction
Absorbing Markov chain
ABX test
Accelerated failure time model
Acceptable quality limit
Acceptance sampling
Accidental sampling
Accuracy and precision
Accuracy paradox
Acquiescence bias
Actuarial science
Adapted process
Adaptive estimator
Additive Markov chain
Additive model
Additive smoothing
Additive white Gaussian noise
Adjusted Rand index – see Rand index (subsection)
ADMB software
Admissible decision rule
Age adjustment
Age-standardized mortality rate
Age stratification
Aggregate data
Aggregate pattern
Akaike information criterion
Algebra of random variables
Algebraic statistics
Algorithmic inference
Algorithms for calculating variance
All models are wrong
All-pairs testing
Allan variance
Alignments of random points
Almost surely
Alpha beta filter
Alternative hypothesis
Analyse-it – software
Analysis of categorical data
Analysis of covariance
Analysis of molecular variance
Analysis of rhythmic variance
Analysis of variance
Analytic and enumerative statistical studies
Ancestral graph
Anchor test
Ancillary statistic
ANCOVA redirects to Analysis of covariance
Anderson–Darling test
ANOVA
ANOVA on ranks
ANOVA–simultaneous component analysis
Anomaly detection
Anomaly time series
Anscombe transform
Anscombe's quartet
Antecedent variable
Antithetic variates
Approximate Bayesian computation
Approximate entropy
Arcsine distribution
Area chart
Area compatibility factor
ARGUS distribution
Arithmetic mean
Armitage–Doll multistage model of carcinogenesis
Arrival theorem
Artificial neural network
Ascertainment bias
ASReml software
Association (statistics)
Association mapping
Association scheme
Assumed mean
Astrostatistics
Asymptotic distribution
Asymptotic equipartition property (information theory)
Asymptotic normality redirects to Asymptotic distribution
Asymptotic relative efficiency redirects to Efficiency (statistics)
Asymptotic theory (statistics)
Atkinson index
Attack rate
Augmented Dickey–Fuller test
Aumann's agreement theorem
Autocorrelation
Autocorrelation plot redirects to Correlogram
Autocovariance
Autoregressive conditional duration
Autoregressive conditional heteroskedasticity
Autoregressive fractionally integrated moving average
Autoregressive integrated moving average
Autoregressive model
Autoregressive–moving-average model
Auxiliary particle filter
Average
Average treatment effect
Averaged one-dependence estimators
Azuma's inequality

B

BA model model for a random network
Backfitting algorithm
Balance equation
Balanced incomplete block design redirects to Block design
Balanced repeated replication
Balding–Nichols model
Banburismus related to Bayesian networks
Bangdiwala's B
Bapat–Beg theorem
Bar chart
Barabási–Albert model
Barber–Johnson diagram
Barnard's test
Barnardisation
Barnes interpolation
Bartlett's method
Bartlett's test
Bartlett's theorem
Base rate
Baseball statistics
Basu's theorem
Bates distribution
Baum–Welch algorithm
Bayes classifier
Bayes error rate
Bayes estimator
Bayes factor
Bayes linear statistics
Bayes' rule
Bayes' theorem
Evidence under Bayes theorem
Bayesian – disambiguation
Bayesian average
Bayesian brain
Bayesian econometrics
Bayesian experimental design
Bayesian game
Bayesian inference
Bayesian inference in marketing
Bayesian inference in phylogeny
Bayesian inference using Gibbs sampling
Bayesian information criterion
Bayesian linear regression
Bayesian model comparison – see Bayes factor
Bayesian multivariate linear regression
Bayesian network
Bayesian probability
Bayesian search theory
Bayesian spam filtering
Bayesian statistics
Bayesian tool for methylation analysis
Bayesian vector autoregression
BCMP network queueing theory
Bean machine
Behrens–Fisher distribution
Behrens–Fisher problem
Belief propagation
Belt transect
Benford's law
Benini distribution
Bennett's inequality
Berkson error model
Berkson's paradox
Berlin procedure
Bernoulli distribution
Bernoulli process
Bernoulli sampling
Bernoulli scheme
Bernoulli trial
Bernstein inequalities (probability theory)
Bernstein–von Mises theorem
Berry–Esseen theorem
Bertrand's ballot theorem
Bertrand's box paradox
Bessel process
Bessel's correction
Best linear unbiased prediction
Beta (finance)
Beta-binomial distribution
Beta-binomial model
Beta distribution
Beta function for incomplete beta function
Beta negative binomial distribution
Beta prime distribution
Beta rectangular distribution
Beverton–Holt model
Bhatia–Davis inequality
Bhattacharya coefficient redirects to Bhattacharyya distance
Bias (statistics)
Bias of an estimator
Biased random walk (biochemistry)
Biased sample – see Sampling bias
Biclustering
Big O in probability notation
Bienaymé–Chebyshev inequality
Bills of Mortality
Bimodal distribution
Binary classification
Bingham distribution
Binomial distribution
Binomial proportion confidence interval
Binomial regression
Binomial test
Bioinformatics
Biometrics (statistics) redirects to Biostatistics
Biostatistics
Biplot
Birnbaum–Saunders distribution
Birth–death process
Bispectrum
Bivariate analysis
Bivariate von Mises distribution
Black–Scholes
Bland–Altman plot
Blind deconvolution
Blind experiment
Block design
Blocking (statistics)
BMDP software
Bochner's theorem
Bonferroni correction
Bonferroni inequalities redirects to Boole's inequality
Boole's inequality
Boolean analysis
Bootstrap aggregating
Bootstrap error-adjusted single-sample technique
Bootstrapping (statistics)
Bootstrapping populations
Borel–Cantelli lemma
Bose–Mesner algebra
Box–Behnken design
Box–Cox distribution
Box–Cox transformation redirects to Power transform
Box–Jenkins
Box–Muller transform
Box–Pierce test
Box plot
Branching process
Bregman divergence
Breusch–Godfrey test
Breusch–Pagan statistic redirects to Breusch–Pagan test
Breusch–Pagan test
Brown–Forsythe test
Brownian bridge
Brownian excursion
Brownian motion
Brownian tree
Bruck–Ryser–Chowla theorem
Burke's theorem
Burr distribution
Business statistics
Bühlmann model
Buzen's algorithm
BV4.1 (software)

C

c-chart
Càdlàg
Calculating demand forecast accuracy
Calculus of predispositions
Calibrated probability assessment
Calibration (probability) subjective probability, redirects to Calibrated probability assessment
Calibration (statistics) the statistical calibration problem
Cancer cluster
Candlestick chart
Canonical analysis
Canonical correlation
Canopy clustering algorithm
Cantor distribution
Carpet plot
Cartogram
Case-control redirects to Case-control study
Case-control study
Catastro of Ensenada a census of part of Spain
Categorical data
Categorical distribution
Categorical variable
Cauchy distribution
Cauchy–Schwarz inequality
Causal Markov condition
CDF-based nonparametric confidence interval
Ceiling effect (statistics)
Cellular noise
Censored regression model
Censoring (clinical trials)
Censoring (statistics)
Centering matrix
Centerpoint (geometry) to which Tukey median redirects
Central composite design
Central limit theorem
Central limit theorem (illustration) redirects to Illustration of the central limit theorem
Central limit theorem for directional statistics
Lyapunov's central limit theorem
Martingale central limit theorem
Central moment
Central tendency
Census
Cepstrum
CHAID – CHi-squared Automatic Interaction Detector
Chain rule for Kolmogorov complexity
Challenge–dechallenge–rechallenge
Champernowne distribution
Change detection
Change detection (GIS)
Chapman–Kolmogorov equation
Chapman–Robbins bound
Characteristic function (probability theory)
Chauvenet's criterion
Chebyshev center
Chebyshev's inequality
Checking if a coin is biased redirects to Checking whether a coin is fair
Checking whether a coin is fair
Cheeger bound
Chemometrics
Chernoff bound a special case of Chernoff's inequality
Chernoff face
Chernoff's distribution
Chernoff's inequality
Chi distribution
Chi-squared distribution
Chi-squared test
Chinese restaurant process
Choropleth map
Chou's invariance theorem
Chow test
Chronux software
Circular analysis
Circular distribution
Circular error probable
Circular statistics redirects to Directional statistics
Circular uniform distribution
Civic statistics
Clark–Ocone theorem
Class membership probabilities
Classic data sets
Classical definition of probability
Classical test theory  – psychometrics
Classification rule
Classifier (mathematics)
Climate ensemble
Climograph
Clinical significance
Clinical study design
Clinical trial
Clinical utility of diagnostic tests
Cliodynamics
Closed testing procedure
Cluster analysis
Cluster randomised controlled trial
Cluster sampling
Cluster-weighted modeling
Clustering high-dimensional data
CMA-ES (Covariance Matrix Adaptation Evolution Strategy)
Coalescent theory
Cochran's C test
Cochran's Q test
Cochran's theorem
Cochran–Armitage test for trend
Cochran–Mantel–Haenszel statistics
Cochrane–Orcutt estimation
Coding (social sciences)
Coefficient of coherence redirects to Coherence (statistics)
Coefficient of determination
Coefficient of dispersion
Coefficient of variation
Cognitive pretesting
Cohen's class distribution function – a time-frequency distribution function
Cohen's kappa
Coherence (signal processing)
Coherence (statistics)
Cohort (statistics)
Cohort effect
Cohort study
Cointegration
Collectively exhaustive events
Collider (epidemiology)
Combinatorial data analysis
Combinatorial design
Combinatorial meta-analysis
Common-method variance
Common mode failure
Common cause and special cause (statistics)
Comonotonicity
Comparing means
Comparison of general and generalized linear models
Comparison of statistical packages
Comparisonwise error rate
Complementary event
Complete-linkage clustering
Complete spatial randomness
Completely randomized design
Completeness (statistics)
Compositional data
Composite bar chart
Compound Poisson distribution
Compound Poisson process
Compound probability distribution
Computational formula for the variance
Computational learning theory
Computational statistics
Computer experiment
Computer-assisted survey information collection
Concomitant (statistics)
Concordance correlation coefficient
Concordant pair
Concrete illustration of the central limit theorem
Concurrent validity
Conditional change model
Conditional distribution – see Conditional probability distribution
Conditional dependence
Conditional expectation
Conditional independence
Conditional probability
Conditional probability distribution
Conditional random field
Conditional variance
Conditionality principle
Confidence band redirects to Confidence and prediction bands
Confidence distribution
Confidence interval
Confidence region
Configural frequency analysis
Confirmation bias
Confirmatory factor analysis
Confounding
Confounding factor
Confusion of the inverse
Congruence coefficient
Conjoint analysis
Conjoint analysis (in healthcare)
Conjoint analysis (in marketing)
Conjugate prior
Consensus-based assessment
Consensus clustering
Consensus forecast
Conservatism (belief revision)
Consistency (statistics)
Consistent estimator
Constant elasticity of substitution
Constant false alarm rate
Constraint (information theory)
Consumption distribution
Contact process (mathematics)
Content validity
Contiguity (probability theory)
Contingency table
Continuity correction
Continuous distribution – see Continuous probability distribution
Continuous mapping theorem
Continuous probability distribution
Continuous stochastic process
Continuous-time Markov process
Continuous-time stochastic process
Contrast (statistics)
Control chart
Control event rate
Control limits
Control variate
Controlling for a variable
Convergence of measures
Convergence of random variables
Convex hull
Convolution of probability distributions
Convolution random number generator
Conway–Maxwell–Poisson distribution
Cook's distance
Cophenetic correlation
Copula (statistics)
Cornish–Fisher expansion
Correct sampling
Correction for attenuation
Correlation
Correlation and dependence
Correlation does not imply causation
Correlation clustering
Correlation function
Correlation function (astronomy)
Correlation function (quantum field theory)
Correlation function (statistical mechanics)
Correlation inequality
Correlation ratio
Correlogram
Correspondence analysis
Cosmic variance
Cost-of-living index
Count data
Counternull
Counting process
Covariance
Covariance and correlation
Covariance intersection
Covariance matrix
Covariance function
Covariate
Cover's theorem
Coverage probability
Cox process
Cox's theorem
Cox–Ingersoll–Ross model
Cramér–Rao bound
Cramér–von Mises criterion
Cramér’s decomposition theorem
Cramér's theorem (large deviations)
Cramér's V
Craps principle
Credal set
Credible interval
Cricket statistics
Crime statistics
Critical region redirects to Statistical hypothesis testing
Cromwell's rule
Cronbach's α
Cross-correlation
Cross-covariance
Cross-entropy method
Cross-sectional data
Cross-sectional regression
Cross-sectional study
Cross-spectrum
Cross tabulation
Cross-validation (statistics)
Crossover study
Crystal Ball function – a probability distribution
Cumulant
Cumulant generating function redirects to cumulant
Cumulative accuracy profile
Cumulative distribution function
Cumulative frequency analysis
Cumulative incidence
Cunningham function
CURE data clustering algorithm
Curve fitting
CUSUM
Cuzick–Edwards test
Cyclostationary process

D

d-separation
D/M/1 queue
D'Agostino's K-squared test
Dagum distribution
DAP open source software
Data analysis
Data assimilation
Data binning
Data classification (business intelligence)
Data cleansing
Data clustering
Data collection
Data Desk software
Data dredging
Data fusion
Data generating process
Data mining
Data reduction
Data point
Data quality assurance
Data set
Data-snooping bias
Data stream clustering
Data transformation (statistics)
Data visualization
DataDetective software
Dataplot software
Davies–Bouldin index
Davis distribution
De Finetti's game
De Finetti's theorem
DeFries–Fulker regression
de Moivre's law
De Moivre–Laplace theorem
Decision boundary
Decision theory
Decomposition of time series
Degenerate distribution
Degrees of freedom (statistics)
Delaporte distribution
Delphi method
Delta method
Demand forecasting
Deming regression
Demographics
Demography
Demographic statistics
Dendrogram
Density estimation
Dependent and independent variables
Descriptive research
Descriptive statistics
Design effect
Design matrix
Design of experiments
The Design of Experiments (book by Fisher)
Detailed balance
Detection theory
Determining the number of clusters in a data set
Detrended correspondence analysis
Detrended fluctuation analysis
Deviance (statistics)
Deviance information criterion
Deviation (statistics)
Deviation analysis (disambiguation)
DFFITS a regression diagnostic
Diagnostic odds ratio
Dickey–Fuller test
Difference in differences
Differential entropy
Diffusion process
Diffusion-limited aggregation
Dimension reduction
Dilution assay
Direct relationship
Directional statistics
Dirichlet distribution
Dirichlet-multinomial distribution
Dirichlet process
Disattenuation
Discrepancy function
Discrete choice
Discrete choice analysis
Discrete distribution redirects to section of Probability distribution
Discrete frequency domain
Discrete phase-type distribution
Discrete probability distribution redirects to section of Probability distribution
Discrete time
Discretization of continuous features
Discriminant function analysis
Discriminative model
Disorder problem
Distance correlation
Distance sampling
Distributed lag
Distribution fitting
Divergence (statistics)
Diversity index
Divisia index
Divisia monetary aggregates index
Dixon's Q test
Dominating decision rule
Donsker's theorem
Doob decomposition theorem
Doob martingale
Doob's martingale convergence theorems
Doob's martingale inequality
Doob–Meyer decomposition theorem
Doomsday argument
Dot plot (bioinformatics)
Dot plot (statistics)
Double counting (fallacy)
Double descent
Double exponential distribution (disambiguation)
Double mass analysis
Doubly stochastic model
Drift rate redirects to Stochastic drift
Dudley's theorem
Dummy variable (statistics)
Duncan's new multiple range test
Dunn index
Dunnett's test
Durbin test
Durbin–Watson statistic
Dutch book
Dvoretzky–Kiefer–Wolfowitz inequality
Dyadic distribution
Dynamic Bayesian network
Dynamic factor
Dynamic topic model

E

E-statistic
Earth mover's distance
Eaton's inequality
Ecological correlation
Ecological fallacy
Ecological regression
Ecological study
Econometrics
Econometric model
Econometric software redirects to Comparison of statistical packages
Economic data
Economic epidemiology
Economic statistics
Eddy covariance
Edgeworth series
Effect size
Efficiency (statistics)
Efficient estimator
Ehrenfest model
Elastic map
Elliptical distribution
Ellsberg paradox
Elston–Stewart algorithm
EMG distribution
Empirical
Empirical Bayes method
Empirical distribution function
Empirical likelihood
Empirical measure
Empirical orthogonal functions
Empirical probability
Empirical process
Empirical statistical laws
Endogeneity (econometrics)
End point of clinical trials
Energy distance
Energy statistics (disambiguation)
Encyclopedia of Statistical Sciences (book)
Engineering statistics
Engineering tolerance
Engset calculation
Ensemble forecasting
Ensemble Kalman filter
Entropy (information theory)
Entropy estimation
Entropy power inequality
Environmental statistics
Epi Info software
Epidata software
Epidemic model
Epidemiological methods
Epilogism
Epitome (image processing)
Epps effect
Equating test equating
Equipossible
Equiprobable
Erdős–Rényi model
Erlang distribution
Ergodic theory
Ergodicity
Error bar
Error correction model
Error function
Errors and residuals in statistics
Errors-in-variables models
An Essay towards solving a Problem in the Doctrine of Chances
Estimating equations
Estimation theory
Estimation of covariance matrices
Estimation of signal parameters via rotational invariance techniques
Estimator
Etemadi's inequality
Ethical problems using children in clinical trials
Event (probability theory)
Event study
Evidence lower bound
Evidence under Bayes theorem
Evolutionary data mining
Ewens's sampling formula
EWMA chart
Exact statistics
Exact test
Examples of Markov chains
Excess risk
Exchange paradox
Exchangeable random variables
Expander walk sampling
Expectation–maximization algorithm
Expectation propagation
Expected mean squares
Expected utility hypothesis
Expected value
Expected value of sample information
Experiment
Experimental design diagram
Experimental event rate
Experimental uncertainty analysis
Experimenter's bias
Experimentwise error rate
Explained sum of squares
Explained variation
Explanatory variable
Exploratory data analysis
Exploratory factor analysis
Exponential dispersion model
Exponential distribution
Exponential family
Exponential-logarithmic distribution
Exponential power distribution redirects to Generalized normal distribution
Exponential random numbers redirect to subsection of Exponential distribution
Exponential smoothing
Exponentially modified Gaussian distribution
Exponentiated Weibull distribution
Exposure variable
Extended Kalman filter
Extended negative binomial distribution
Extensions of Fisher's method
External validity
Extrapolation domain analysis
Extreme value theory
Extremum estimator

F

F-distribution
F-divergence
F-statistics population genetics
F-test
F-test of equality of variances
F1 score
Facet theory
Factor analysis
Factor regression model
Factor graph
Factorial code
Factorial experiment
Factorial moment
Factorial moment generating function
Failure rate
Fair coin
Falconer's formula
False discovery rate
False nearest neighbor algorithm
False negative
False positive
False positive rate
False positive paradox
Family-wise error rate
Fan chart (time series)
Fano factor
Fast Fourier transform
Fast Kalman filter
FastICA fast independent component analysis
Fat-tailed distribution
Feasible generalized least squares
Feature extraction
Feller process
Feller's coin-tossing constants
Feller-continuous process
Felsenstein's tree-pruning algorithm statistical genetics
Fides (reliability)
Fiducial inference
Field experiment
Fieller's theorem
File drawer problem
Filtering problem (stochastic processes)
Financial econometrics
Financial models with long-tailed distributions and volatility clustering
Finite-dimensional distribution
First-hitting-time model
First-in-man study
Fishburn–Shepp inequality
Fisher consistency
Fisher information
Fisher information metric
Fisher kernel
Fisher transformation
Fisher's exact test
Fisher's inequality
Fisher's linear discriminator
Fisher's method
Fisher's noncentral hypergeometric distribution
Fisher's z-distribution
Fisher–Tippett distribution redirects to Generalized extreme value distribution
Fisher–Tippett–Gnedenko theorem
Five-number summary
Fixed effects estimator and  Fixed effects estimation redirect to Fixed effects model
Fixed-effect Poisson model
FLAME clustering
Fleiss' kappa
Fleming–Viot process
Flood risk assessment
Floor effect
Focused information criterion
Fokker–Planck equation
Folded normal distribution
Forecast bias
Forecast error
Forecast skill
Forecasting
Forest plot
Fork-join queue
Formation matrix
Forward measure
Foster's theorem
Foundations of statistics
Founders of statistics
Fourier analysis
Fowlkes–Mallows index
Fraction of variance unexplained
Fractional Brownian motion
Fractional factorial design
Fréchet distribution
Fréchet mean
Free statistical software
Freedman's paradox
Freedman–Diaconis rule
Freidlin–Wentzell theorem
Frequency (statistics)
Frequency distribution
Frequency domain
Frequency probability
Frequentist inference
Friedman test
Friendship paradox
Frisch–Waugh–Lovell theorem
Fully crossed design
Function approximation
Functional boxplot
Functional data analysis
Funnel plot
Fuzzy logic
Fuzzy measure theory
FWL theorem relating regression and projection

G

G/G/1 queue
G-network
G-test
Galbraith plot
Gallagher Index
Galton–Watson process
Galton's problem
Gambler's fallacy
Gambler's ruin
Gambling and information theory
Game of chance
Gamma distribution
Gamma test (statistics)
Gamma process
Gamma variate
GAUSS (software)
Gauss's inequality
Gauss–Kuzmin distribution
Gauss–Markov process
Gauss–Markov theorem
Gauss–Newton algorithm
Gaussian function
Gaussian isoperimetric inequality
Gaussian measure
Gaussian noise
Gaussian process
Gaussian process emulator
Gaussian q-distribution
Geary's C
GEH statistic – a statistic comparing modelled and observed counts
General linear model
Generalizability theory
Generalized additive model
Generalized additive model for location, scale and shape
Generalized beta distribution
Generalized canonical correlation
Generalized chi-squared distribution
Generalized Dirichlet distribution
Generalized entropy index
Generalized estimating equation
Generalized expected utility
Generalized extreme value distribution
Generalized gamma distribution
Generalized Gaussian distribution
Generalised hyperbolic distribution
Generalized inverse Gaussian distribution
Generalized least squares
Generalized linear array model
Generalized linear mixed model
Generalized linear model
Generalized logistic distribution
Generalized method of moments
Generalized multidimensional scaling
Generalized multivariate log-gamma distribution
Generalized normal distribution
Generalized p-value
Generalized Pareto distribution
Generalized Procrustes analysis
Generalized randomized block design
Generalized Tobit
Generalized Wiener process
Generative model
Genetic epidemiology
GenStat software
Geo-imputation
Geodemographic segmentation
Geometric Brownian motion
Geometric data analysis
Geometric distribution
Geometric median
Geometric standard deviation
Geometric stable distribution
Geospatial predictive modeling
Geostatistics
German tank problem
Gerschenkron effect
Gibbs sampling
Gillespie algorithm
Gini coefficient
Girsanov theorem
Gittins index
GLIM (software) software
Glivenko–Cantelli theorem
GLUE (uncertainty assessment)
Goldfeld–Quandt test
Gompertz distribution
Gompertz function
Gompertz–Makeham law of mortality
Good–Turing frequency estimation
Goodhart's law
Goodman and Kruskal's gamma
Goodman and Kruskal's lambda
Goodness of fit
Gordon–Newell network
Gordon–Newell theorem
Graeco-Latin square
Grand mean
Granger causality
Graph cuts in computer vision a potential application of Bayesian analysis
Graphical model
Graphical models for protein structure
GraphPad InStat software
GraphPad Prism software
Gravity model of trade
Greenwood statistic
Gretl
Group family
Group method of data handling
Group size measures
Grouped data
Grubbs's test for outliers
Guess value
Guesstimate
Gumbel distribution
Guttman scale
Gy's sampling theory

H

h-index
Hájek–Le Cam convolution theorem
Half circle distribution
Half-logistic distribution
Half-normal distribution
Halton sequence
Hamburger moment problem
Hannan–Quinn information criterion
Harris chain
Hardy–Weinberg principle statistical genetics
Hartley's test
Hat matrix
Hammersley–Clifford theorem
Hausdorff moment problem
Hausman specification test redirects to Hausman test
Haybittle–Peto boundary
Hazard function redirects to Failure rate
Hazard ratio
Heaps' law
Health care analytics
Heart rate variability
Heavy-tailed distribution
Heckman correction
Hedonic regression
Hellin's law
Hellinger distance
Helmert–Wolf blocking
Herdan's law
Herfindahl index
Heston model
Heteroscedasticity
Heteroscedasticity-consistent standard errors
Heteroskedasticity – see Heteroscedasticity
Hidden Markov model
Hidden Markov random field
Hidden semi-Markov model
Hierarchical Bayes model
Hierarchical clustering
Hierarchical hidden Markov model
Hierarchical linear modeling
High-dimensional statistics
Higher-order factor analysis
Higher-order statistics
Hirschman uncertainty
Histogram
Historiometry
History of randomness
History of statistics
Hitting time
Hodges' estimator
Hodges–Lehmann estimator
Hoeffding's independence test
Hoeffding's lemma
Hoeffding's inequality
Holm–Bonferroni method
Holtsmark distribution
Homogeneity (statistics)
Homogenization (climate)
Homoscedasticity
Hoover index (a.k.a. Robin Hood index)
Horvitz–Thompson estimator
Hosmer–Lemeshow test
Hotelling's T-squared distribution
How to Lie with Statistics (book)
Howland will forgery trial
Hubbert curve
Huber–White standard error – see Heteroscedasticity-consistent standard errors
Huber loss function
Human subject research
Hurst exponent
Hyper-exponential distribution
Hyper-Graeco-Latin square design
Hyperbolic distribution
Hyperbolic secant distribution
Hypergeometric distribution
Hyperparameter
Hyperprior
Hypoexponential distribution

I

Idealised population
Idempotent matrix
Identifiability
Ignorability
Illustration of the central limit theorem
Image denoising
Importance sampling
Imprecise probability
Impulse response
Imputation (statistics)
Incidence (epidemiology)
Increasing process
Indecomposable distribution
Independence of irrelevant alternatives
Independent component analysis
Independent and identically distributed random variables
Index (economics)
Index number
Index of coincidence
Index of dispersion
Index of dissimilarity
Indicators of spatial association
Indirect least squares
Inductive inference
An inequality on location and scale parameters – see Chebyshev's inequality
Inference
Inferential statistics redirects to Statistical inference
Infinite divisibility (probability)
Infinite monkey theorem
Influence diagram
Info-gap decision theory
Information bottleneck method
Information geometry
Information gain ratio
Information ratio finance
Information source (mathematics)
Information theory
Inherent bias
Inherent zero
Injury prevention application
Innovation (signal processing)
Innovations vector
Institutional review board
Instrumental variable
Integrated nested Laplace approximations
Intention to treat analysis
Interaction (statistics)
Interaction variable see Interaction (statistics)
Interclass correlation
Interdecile range
Interim analysis
Internal consistency
Internal validity
Interquartile mean
Interquartile range
Inter-rater reliability
Interval estimation
Intervening variable
Intra-rater reliability
Intraclass correlation
Invariant estimator
Invariant extended Kalman filter
Inverse distance weighting
Inverse distribution
Inverse Gaussian distribution
Inverse matrix gamma distribution
Inverse Mills ratio
Inverse probability
Inverse probability weighting
Inverse relationship
Inverse-chi-squared distribution
Inverse-gamma distribution
Inverse transform sampling
Inverse-variance weighting
Inverse-Wishart distribution
Iris flower data set
Irwin–Hall distribution
Isomap
Isotonic regression
Isserlis' theorem
Item response theory
Item-total correlation
Item tree analysis
Iterative proportional fitting
Iteratively reweighted least squares
Itô calculus
Itô isometry
Itô's lemma

J

Jaccard index
Jackknife (statistics) redirects to Resampling (statistics)
Jackson network
Jackson's theorem (queueing theory)
Jadad scale
James–Stein estimator
Jarque–Bera test
Jeffreys prior
Jensen's inequality
Jensen–Shannon divergence
JMulTi software
Johansen test
Johnson SU distribution
Joint probability distribution
Jonckheere's trend test
JMP (statistical software)
Jump process
Jump-diffusion model
Junction tree algorithm

K

K-distribution
K-means algorithm redirects to k-means clustering
K-means++
K-medians clustering
K-medoids
K-statistic
Kalman filter
Kaplan–Meier estimator
Kappa coefficient
Kappa statistic
Karhunen–Loève theorem
Kendall tau distance
Kendall tau rank correlation coefficient
Kendall's notation
Kendall's W Kendall's coefficient of concordance
Kent distribution
Kernel density estimation
Kernel Fisher discriminant analysis
Kernel methods
Kernel principal component analysis
Kernel regression
Kernel smoother
Kernel (statistics)
Khmaladze transformation (probability theory)
Killed process
Khintchine inequality
Kingman's formula
Kirkwood approximation
Kish grid
Kitchen sink regression
Klecka's tau
Knightian uncertainty
Kolmogorov backward equation
Kolmogorov continuity theorem
Kolmogorov extension theorem
Kolmogorov's criterion
Kolmogorov's generalized criterion
Kolmogorov's inequality
Kolmogorov's zero–one law
Kolmogorov–Smirnov test
KPSS test
Kriging
Kruskal–Wallis one-way analysis of variance
Kuder–Richardson Formula 20
Kuiper's test
Kullback's inequality
Kullback–Leibler divergence
Kumaraswamy distribution
Kurtosis
Kushner equation

L

L-estimator
L-moment
Labour Force Survey
Lack-of-fit sum of squares
Lady tasting tea
Lag operator
Lag windowing
Lambda distribution disambiguation
Landau distribution
Lander–Green algorithm
Language model
Laplace distribution
Laplace principle (large deviations theory)
LaplacesDemon software
Large deviations theory
Large deviations of Gaussian random functions
LARS – see least-angle regression
Latent variable, latent variable model
Latent class model
Latent Dirichlet allocation
Latent growth modeling
Latent semantic analysis
Latin rectangle
Latin square
Latin hypercube sampling
Law (stochastic processes)
Law of averages
Law of comparative judgment
Law of large numbers
Law of the iterated logarithm
Law of the unconscious statistician
Law of total covariance
Law of total cumulance
Law of total expectation
Law of total probability
Law of total variance
Law of truly large numbers
Layered hidden Markov model
Le Cam's theorem
Lead time bias
Least absolute deviations
Least-angle regression
Least squares
Least-squares spectral analysis
Least squares support vector machine
Least trimmed squares
Learning theory (statistics)
Leftover hash-lemma
Lehmann–Scheffé theorem
Length time bias
Levene's test
Level of analysis
Level of measurement
Levenberg–Marquardt algorithm
Leverage (statistics)
Levey–Jennings chart redirects to Laboratory quality control
Lévy's convergence theorem
Lévy's continuity theorem
Lévy arcsine law
Lévy distribution
Lévy flight
Lévy process
Lewontin's Fallacy
Lexis diagram
Lexis ratio
Lies, damned lies, and statistics
Life expectancy
Life table
Lift (data mining)
Likelihood function
Likelihood principle
Likelihood-ratio test
Likelihood ratios in diagnostic testing
Likert scale
Lilliefors test
Limited dependent variable
Limiting density of discrete points
Lincoln index
Lindeberg's condition
Lindley equation
Lindley's paradox
Line chart
Line-intercept sampling
Linear classifier
Linear discriminant analysis
Linear least squares
Linear model
Linear prediction
Linear probability model
Linear regression
Linguistic demography
Linnik distribution redirects to Geometric stable distribution
LISREL proprietary statistical software package
List of basic statistics topics redirects to Outline of statistics
List of convolutions of probability distributions
List of graphical methods
List of information graphics software
List of probability topics
List of random number generators
List of scientific journals in statistics
List of statistical packages
List of statisticians
Listwise deletion
Little's law
Littlewood's law
Ljung–Box test
Local convex hull
Local independence
Local martingale
Local regression
Location estimation redirects to Location parameter
Location estimation in sensor networks
Location parameter
Location test
Location-scale family
Local asymptotic normality
Locality (statistics)
Loess curve redirects to Local regression
Log-Cauchy distribution
Log-Laplace distribution
Log-normal distribution
Log-linear analysis
Log-linear model
Log-linear modeling redirects to Poisson regression
Log-log plot
Log-logistic distribution
Logarithmic distribution
Logarithmic mean
Logistic distribution
Logistic function
Logistic regression
Logit
Logit analysis in marketing
Logit-normal distribution
Log-normal distribution
Logrank test
Lomax distribution
Long-range dependency
Long Tail
Long-tail traffic
Longitudinal study
Longstaff–Schwartz model
Lorenz curve
Loss function
Lot quality assurance sampling
Lotka's law
Low birth weight paradox
Lucia de Berk prob/stats related court case
Lukacs's proportion-sum independence theorem
Lumpability
Lusser's law
Lyapunov's central limit theorem

M

M/D/1 queue
M/G/1 queue
M/M/1 queue
M/M/c queue
M-estimator
Redescending M-estimator
M-separation
Mabinogion sheep problem
Machine learning
Mahalanobis distance
Main effect
Mallows's Cp
MANCOVA
Manhattan plot
Mann–Whitney U
MANOVA
Mantel test
MAP estimator redirects to Maximum a posteriori estimation
Marchenko–Pastur distribution
Marcinkiewicz–Zygmund inequality
Marcum Q-function
Margin of error
Marginal conditional stochastic dominance
Marginal distribution
Marginal likelihood
Marginal model
Marginal variable redirects to Marginal distribution
Mark and recapture
Markov additive process
Markov blanket
Markov chain
Markov chain geostatistics
Markov chain mixing time
Markov chain Monte Carlo
Markov decision process
Markov information source
Markov kernel
Markov logic network
Markov model
Markov network
Markov process
Markov property
Markov random field
Markov renewal process
Markov's inequality
Markovian arrival processes
Marsaglia polar method
Martingale (probability theory)
Martingale difference sequence
Martingale representation theorem
Master equation
Matched filter
Matching pursuit
Matching (statistics)
Matérn covariance function
Mathematica – software
Mathematical biology
Mathematical modelling in epidemiology
Mathematical modelling of infectious disease
Mathematical statistics
Matthews correlation coefficient
Matrix gamma distribution
Matrix normal distribution
Matrix population models
Matrix t-distribution
Mauchly's sphericity test
Maximal ergodic theorem
Maximal information coefficient
Maximum a posteriori estimation
Maximum entropy classifier redirects to Logistic regression
Maximum-entropy Markov model
Maximum entropy method redirects to Principle of maximum entropy
Maximum entropy probability distribution
Maximum entropy spectral estimation
Maximum likelihood
Maximum likelihood sequence estimation
Maximum parsimony
Maximum spacing estimation
Maxwell speed distribution
Maxwell–Boltzmann distribution
Maxwell's theorem
Mazziotta–Pareto index
MCAR (missing completely at random)
McCullagh's parametrization of the Cauchy distributions
McDiarmid's inequality
McDonald–Kreitman test statistical genetics
McKay's approximation for the coefficient of variation
McNemar's test
Meadow's law
Mean
Mean see also expected value
Mean absolute error
Mean absolute percentage error
Mean absolute scaled error
Mean and predicted response
Mean deviation (disambiguation)
Mean difference
Mean integrated squared error
Mean of circular quantities
Mean percentage error
Mean preserving spread
Mean reciprocal rank
Mean signed difference
Mean square quantization error
Mean square weighted deviation
Mean squared error
Mean squared prediction error
Mean time between failures
Mean-reverting process redirects to Ornstein–Uhlenbeck process
Mean value analysis
Measurement, level of – see level of measurement.
Measurement invariance
MedCalc software
Median
Median absolute deviation
Median polish
Median test
Mediation (statistics)
Medical statistics
Medoid
Memorylessness
Mendelian randomization
Meta-analysis
Meta-regression
Metalog distribution
Method of moments (statistics)
Method of simulated moments
Method of support
Metropolis–Hastings algorithm
Mexican paradox
Microdata (statistics)
Midhinge
Mid-range
MinHash
Minimax
Minimax estimator
Minimisation (clinical trials)
Minimum chi-square estimation
Minimum distance estimation
Minimum mean square error
Minimum-variance unbiased estimator
Minimum viable population
Minitab
MINQUE minimum norm quadratic unbiased estimation
Misleading graph
Missing completely at random
Missing data
Missing values – see Missing data
Mittag–Leffler distribution
Mixed logit
Misuse of statistics
Mixed data sampling
Mixed-design analysis of variance
Mixed model
Mixing (mathematics)
Mixture distribution
Mixture model
Mixture (probability)
MLwiN
Mode (statistics)
Model output statistics
Model selection
Model specification
Moderator variable redirects to Moderation (statistics)
Modifiable areal unit problem
Moffat distribution
Moment (mathematics)
Moment-generating function
Moments, method of see method of moments (statistics)
Moment problem
Monotone likelihood ratio
Monte Carlo integration
Monte Carlo method
Monte Carlo method for photon transport
Monte Carlo methods for option pricing
Monte Carlo methods in finance
Monte Carlo molecular modeling
Moral graph
Moran process
Moran's I
Morisita's overlap index
Morris method
Mortality rate
Most probable number
Moving average
Moving-average model
Moving average representation redirects to Wold's theorem
Moving least squares
Multi-armed bandit
Multi-vari chart
Multiclass classification
Multiclass LDA (linear discriminant analysis) redirects to Linear discriminant analysis
Multicollinearity
Multidimensional analysis
Multidimensional Chebyshev's inequality
Multidimensional panel data
Multidimensional scaling
Multifactor design of experiments software
Multifactor dimensionality reduction
Multilevel model
Multilinear principal component analysis
Multinomial distribution
Multinomial logistic regression
Multinomial logit – see Multinomial logistic regression
Multinomial probit
Multinomial test
Multiple baseline design
Multiple comparisons
Multiple correlation
Multiple correspondence analysis
Multiple discriminant analysis
Multiple-indicator kriging
Multiple Indicator Cluster Survey
Multiple of the median
Multiple testing correction redirects to Multiple comparisons
Multiple-try Metropolis
Multiresolution analysis
Multiscale decision making
Multiscale geometric analysis
Multistage testing
Multitaper
Multitrait-multimethod matrix
Multivariate adaptive regression splines
Multivariate analysis
Multivariate analysis of variance
Multivariate distribution – see Joint probability distribution
Multivariate kernel density estimation
Multivariate normal distribution
Multivariate Pareto distribution
Multivariate Pólya distribution
Multivariate probit redirects to Multivariate probit model
Multivariate random variable
Multivariate stable distribution
Multivariate statistics
Multivariate Student distribution redirects to Multivariate t-distribution
Multivariate t-distribution

N

n = 1 fallacy
N of 1 trial
Naive Bayes classifier
Nakagami distribution
National and international statistical services
Nash–Sutcliffe model efficiency coefficient
National Health Interview Survey
Natural experiment
Natural exponential family
Natural process variation
NCSS (statistical software)
Nearest-neighbor chain algorithm
Negative binomial distribution
Negative multinomial distribution
Negative predictive value
Negative relationship
Negentropy
Neighbourhood components analysis
Neighbor joining
Nelson rules
Nelson–Aalen estimator
Nemenyi test
Nested case-control study
Nested sampling algorithm
Network probability matrix
Neural network
Neutral vector
Newcastle–Ottawa scale
Newey–West estimator
Newman–Keuls method
Neyer d-optimal test
Neyman construction
Neyman–Pearson lemma
Nicholson–Bailey model
Nominal category
Noncentral beta distribution
Noncentral chi distribution
Noncentral chi-squared distribution
Noncentral F-distribution
Noncentral hypergeometric distributions
Noncentral t-distribution
Noncentrality parameter
Nonlinear autoregressive exogenous model
Nonlinear dimensionality reduction
Non-linear iterative partial least squares
Nonlinear regression
Non-homogeneous Poisson process
Non-linear least squares
Non-negative matrix factorization
Nonparametric skew
Non-parametric statistics
Non-response bias
Non-sampling error
Nonparametric regression
Nonprobability sampling
Normal curve equivalent
Normal distribution
Normal probability plot see also rankit
Normal score see also rankit and Z score
Normal variance-mean mixture
Normal-exponential-gamma distribution
Normal-gamma distribution
Normal-inverse Gaussian distribution
Normal-scaled inverse gamma distribution
Normality test
Normalization (statistics)
Normally distributed and uncorrelated does not imply independent
Notation in probability and statistics
Novikov's condition
np-chart
Null distribution
Null hypothesis
Null result
Nuisance parameter
Nuisance variable
Numerical data
Numerical methods for linear least squares
Numerical parameter redirects to statistical parameter
Numerical smoothing and differentiation
Nuremberg Code

O

Observable variable
Observational equivalence
Observational error
Observational study
Observed information
Occupancy frequency distribution
Odds
Odds algorithm
Odds ratio
Official statistics
Ogden tables
Ogive (statistics)
Omitted-variable bias
Omnibus test
One- and two-tailed tests
One-class classification
One-factor-at-a-time method
One-tailed test redirects to One- and two-tailed tests
One-way analysis of variance
Online NMF Online Non-negative Matrix Factorisation
Open-label trial
OpenEpi software
OpenBUGS software
Operational confound
Operational sex ratio
Operations research
Opinion poll
Optimal decision
Optimal design
Optimal discriminant analysis
Optimal matching
Optimal stopping
Optimality criterion
Optimistic knowledge gradient
Optional stopping theorem
Order of a kernel
Order of integration
Order statistic
Ordered logit
Ordered probit
Ordered subset expectation maximization
Ordinal regression
Ordinary least squares
Ordination (statistics)
Ornstein–Uhlenbeck process
Orthogonal array testing
Orthogonality
Orthogonality principle
Outlier
Outliers in statistics redirects to Robust statistics (section)
Outliers ratio
Outline of probability
Outline of regression analysis
Outline of statistics
Overdispersion
Overfitting
Owen's T function
OxMetrics software

P

p-chart
p-rep
P-value
P–P plot
Page's trend test
Paid survey
Paired comparison analysis
Paired difference test
Pairwise comparison
Pairwise independence
Panel analysis
Panel data
Panjer recursion a class of discrete compound distributions
Paley–Zygmund inequality
Parabolic fractal distribution
PARAFAC (parallel factor analysis)
Parallel coordinates – graphical display of data
Parallel factor analysis redirects to PARAFAC
Paradigm (experimental)
Parameter identification problem
Parameter space
Parametric family
Parametric model
Parametric statistics
Pareto analysis
Pareto chart
Pareto distribution
Pareto index
Pareto interpolation
Pareto principle
Park test
Partial autocorrelation redirects to Partial autocorrelation function
Partial autocorrelation function
Partial correlation
Partial least squares
Partial least squares regression
Partial leverage
Partial regression plot
Partial residual plot
Particle filter
Partition of sums of squares
Parzen window
Path analysis (statistics)
Path coefficient
Path space (disambiguation)
Pattern recognition
Pearson's chi-squared test (one of various chi-squared tests)
Pearson distribution
Pearson product-moment correlation coefficient
Pedometric mapping
People v. Collins (prob/stats related court case)
Per capita
Per-comparison error rate
Per-protocol analysis
Percentile
Percentile rank
Periodic variation redirects to Seasonality
Periodogram
Peirce's criterion
Pensim2 an econometric model
Percentage point
Permutation test redirects to Resampling (statistics)
Pharmaceutical statistics
Phase dispersion minimization
Phase-type distribution
Phi coefficient
Phillips–Perron test
Philosophy of probability
Philosophy of statistics
Pickands–Balkema–de Haan theorem
Pie chart
Piecewise-deterministic Markov process
Pignistic probability
Pinsker's inequality
Pitman closeness criterion
Pitman–Koopman–Darmois theorem
Pitman–Yor process
Pivotal quantity
Placebo-controlled study
Plackett–Burman design
Plate notation
Plot (graphics)
Pocock boundary
Poincaré plot
Point-biserial correlation coefficient
Point estimation
Point pattern analysis
Point process
Poisson binomial distribution
Poisson distribution
Poisson hidden Markov model
Poisson limit theorem
Poisson process
Poisson regression
Poisson random numbers redirects to section of Poisson distribution
Poisson sampling
 Polar distribution – see Circular distribution
Policy capturing
Political forecasting
Pollaczek–Khinchine formula
Pollyanna Creep
Polykay
Poly-Weibull distribution
Polychoric correlation
Polynomial and rational function modeling
Polynomial chaos
Polynomial regression
Polytree  (Bayesian networks)
Pooled standard deviation redirects to Pooled variance
Pooling design
Popoviciu's inequality on variances
Population
Population dynamics
Population ecology application
Population modeling
Population process
Population pyramid
Population statistics
Population variance
Population viability analysis
Portmanteau test
Positive predictive value
Post-hoc analysis
Posterior predictive distribution
Posterior probability
Power law
Power transform
Prais–Winsten estimation
Pre- and post-test probability
Precision (statistics)
Precision and recall
Prediction interval
Predictive analytics
Predictive inference
Predictive informatics
Predictive intake modelling
Predictive modelling
Predictive validity
Preference regression (in marketing)
Preferential attachment process – see Preferential attachment
PRESS statistic
Prevalence
Principal component analysis
Multilinear principal-component analysis
Principal component regression
Principal geodesic analysis
Principal stratification
Principle of indifference
Principle of marginality
Principle of maximum entropy
Prior knowledge for pattern recognition
Prior probability
Prior probability distribution redirects to Prior probability
Probabilistic causation
Probabilistic design
Probabilistic forecasting
Probabilistic latent semantic analysis
Probabilistic metric space
Probabilistic proposition
Probabilistic relational model
Probability
Probability bounds analysis
Probability box
Probability density function
Probability distribution
Probability distribution function (disambiguation)
Probability integral transform
Probability interpretations
Probability mass function
Probability matching
Probability metric
Probability of error
Probability of precipitation
Probability plot
Probability plot correlation coefficient redirects to Q–Q plot
Probability plot correlation coefficient plot
Probability space
Probability theory
Probability-generating function
Probable error
Probit
Probit model
Procedural confound
Process control
Process Window Index
Procrustes analysis
Proebsting's paradox
Product distribution
Product form solution
Profile likelihood redirects to Likelihood function
Progressively measurable process
Prognostics
Projection pursuit
Projection pursuit regression
Proof of Stein's example
Propagation of uncertainty
Propensity probability
Propensity score
Propensity score matching
Proper linear model
Proportional hazards models
Proportional reduction in loss
Prosecutor's fallacy
Proxy (statistics)
Psephology
Pseudo-determinant
Pseudo-random number sampling
Pseudocount
Pseudolikelihood
Pseudomedian
Pseudoreplication
PSPP (free software)
Psychological statistics
Psychometrics
Pythagorean expectation

Q

Q test
Q-exponential distribution
Q-function
Q-Gaussian distribution
Q–Q plot
Q-statistic
Quadrat
Quadrant count ratio
Quadratic classifier
Quadratic form (statistics)
Quadratic variation
Qualitative comparative analysis
Qualitative data
Qualitative variation
Quality control
Quantile
Quantile function
Quantile normalization
Quantile regression
Quantile-parameterized distribution
Quantitative marketing research
Quantitative psychological research
Quantitative research
Quantum (Statistical programming language)
Quartile
Quartile coefficient of dispersion
Quasi-birth–death process
Quasi-experiment
Quasi-experimental design – see Design of quasi-experiments
Quasi-likelihood
Quasi-maximum likelihood
Quasireversibility
Quasi-variance
Questionnaire
Queueing model
Queueing theory
Queuing delay
Queuing theory in teletraffic engineering
Quota sampling

R

R programming language – see R (programming language)
R v Adams (prob/stats related court case)
Radar chart
Rademacher distribution
Radial basis function network
Raikov's theorem
Raised cosine distribution
Ramaswami's formula
Ramsey RESET test the Ramsey Regression Equation Specification Error Test
Rand index
Random assignment
Random compact set
Random data see randomness
Random effects estimation – see Random effects model
Random effects model
Random element
Random field
Random function
Random graph
Random matrix
Random measure
Random multinomial logit
Random naive Bayes
Random permutation statistics
Random regular graph
Random sample
Random sampling
Random sequence
Random variable
Random variate
Random walk
Random walk hypothesis
Randomization
Randomized block design
Randomized controlled trial
Randomized decision rule
Randomized experiment
Randomized response
Randomness
Randomness tests
Range (statistics)
Rank abundance curve
Rank correlation mainly links to two following
Spearman's rank correlation coefficient
Kendall tau rank correlation coefficient
Rank product
Rank-size distribution
Ranking
Rankit
Ranklet
RANSAC
Rao–Blackwell theorem
Rao-Blackwellisation – see Rao–Blackwell theorem
Rasch model
Polytomous Rasch model
Rasch model estimation
Ratio distribution
Ratio estimator
Rational quadratic covariance function
Rayleigh distribution
Rayleigh mixture distribution
Raw score
Realization (probability)
Recall bias
Receiver operating characteristic
Reciprocal distribution
Rectified Gaussian distribution
Recurrence period density entropy
Recurrence plot
Recurrence quantification analysis
Recursive Bayesian estimation
Recursive least squares
Recursive partitioning
Reduced form
Reference class problem
Reflected Brownian motion
Regenerative process
Regression analysis see also linear regression
Regression Analysis of Time Series proprietary software
Regression control chart
Regression diagnostic
Regression dilution
Regression discontinuity design
Regression estimation
Regression fallacy
Regression-kriging
Regression model validation
Regression toward the mean
Regret (decision theory)
Reification (statistics)
Rejection sampling
Relationships among probability distributions
Relative change and difference
Relative efficiency redirects to Efficiency (statistics)
Relative index of inequality
Relative likelihood
Relative risk
Relative risk reduction
Relative standard deviation
Relative standard error redirects to Relative standard deviation
Relative variance redirects to Relative standard deviation
Relative survival
Relativistic Breit–Wigner distribution
Relevance vector machine
Reliability (statistics)
Reliability block diagram
Reliability engineering
Reliability theory
Reliability theory of aging and longevity
Rencontres numbers a discrete distribution
Renewal theory
Repeatability
Repeated measures design
Replication (statistics)
Representation validity
Reproducibility
Resampling (statistics)
Rescaled range
Resentful demoralization experimental design
Residual. See errors and residuals in statistics.
Residual sum of squares
Response bias
Response rate (survey)
Response surface methodology
Response variable
Restricted maximum likelihood
Restricted randomization
Reversible-jump Markov chain Monte Carlo
Reversible dynamics
Rind et al. controversy interpretations of paper involving meta-analysis
Rice distribution
Richardson–Lucy deconvolution
Ridge regression redirects to Tikhonov regularization
Ridit scoring
Risk adjusted mortality rate
Risk factor
Risk function
Risk perception
Risk theory
Risk–benefit analysis
Robbins lemma
Robust Bayesian analysis
Robust confidence intervals
Robust measures of scale
Robust regression
Robust statistics
Root mean square
Root-mean-square deviation
Root mean square deviation (bioinformatics)
Root mean square fluctuation
Ross's conjecture
Rossmo's formula
Rothamsted Experimental Station
Round robin test
Rubin causal model
Ruin theory
Rule of succession
Rule of three (medicine)
Run chart
RV coefficient

S

S (programming language)
S-PLUS
Safety in numbers
Sally Clark (prob/stats related court case)
Sammon projection
Sample mean and covariance redirects to Sample mean and sample covariance
Sample mean and sample covariance
Sample maximum and minimum
Sample size determination
Sample space
Sample (statistics)
Sample-continuous process
Sampling (statistics)
Simple random sampling
Snowball sampling
Systematic sampling
Stratified sampling
Cluster sampling
distance sampling
Multistage sampling
Nonprobability sampling
Slice sampling
Sampling bias
Sampling design
Sampling distribution
Sampling error
Sampling fraction
Sampling frame
Sampling probability
Sampling risk
Samuelson's inequality
Sargan test
SAS (software)
SAS language
 SAS System – see SAS (software)
Savitzky–Golay smoothing filter
Sazonov's theorem
Saturated array
Scale analysis (statistics)
Scale parameter
Scaled-inverse-chi-squared distribution
Scaling pattern of occupancy
Scatter matrix
Scatter plot
Scatterplot smoothing
Scheffé's method
Scheirer–Ray–Hare test
Schilder's theorem
Schramm–Loewner evolution
Schuette–Nesbitt formula
Schwarz criterion
Score (statistics)
Score test
Scoring algorithm
Scoring rule
SCORUS
Scott's Pi
SDMX a standard for exchanging statistical data
Seasonal adjustment
Seasonality
Seasonal subseries plot
Seasonal variation
Seasonally adjusted annual rate
Second moment method
Secretary problem
Secular variation
Seed-based d mapping
Seemingly unrelated regressions
Seismic to simulation
Selection bias
Selective recruitment
Self-organizing map
Self-selection bias
Self-similar process
Segmented regression
Seismic inversion
Self-similarity matrix
Semantic mapping (statistics)
Semantic relatedness
Semantic similarity
Semi-Markov process
Semi-log graph
Semidefinite embedding
Semimartingale
Semiparametric model
Semiparametric regression
Semivariance
Sensitivity (tests)
Sensitivity analysis
Sensitivity and specificity
Sensitivity index
Separation test
Sequential analysis
Sequential estimation
Sequential Monte Carlo methods redirects to Particle filter
Sequential probability ratio test
Serial dependence
Seriation (archaeology)
SETAR (model) a time series model
Sethi model
Seven-number summary
Sexual dimorphism measures
Shannon–Hartley theorem
Shape of the distribution
Shape parameter
Shapiro–Wilk test
Sharpe ratio
SHAZAM (software)
Shewhart individuals control chart
Shifted Gompertz distribution
Shifted log-logistic distribution
Shifting baseline
Shrinkage (statistics)
Shrinkage estimator
Sichel distribution
Siegel–Tukey test
Sieve estimator
Sigma-algebra
SigmaStat software
Sign test
Signal-to-noise ratio
Signal-to-noise statistic
Significance analysis of microarrays
Silhouette (clustering)
Simfit software
Similarity matrix
Simon model
Simple linear regression
Simple moving average crossover
Simple random sample
Simpson's paradox
Simulated annealing
Simultaneous equation methods (econometrics)
Simultaneous equations model
Single equation methods (econometrics)
Single-linkage clustering
Singular distribution
Singular spectrum analysis
Sinusoidal model
Sinkov statistic
Size (statistics)
Skellam distribution
Skew normal distribution
Skewness
Skorokhod's representation theorem
Slash distribution
Slice sampling
Sliced inverse regression
Slutsky's theorem
Small area estimation
Smearing retransformation
Smoothing
Smoothing spline
Smoothness (probability theory)
Snowball sampling
Sobel test
Social network change detection
Social statistics
SOFA Statistics software
Soliton distribution redirects to Luby transform code
Somers' D
Sørensen similarity index
Spaghetti plot
Sparse binary polynomial hashing
Sparse PCA sparse principal components analysis
Sparsity-of-effects principle
Spatial analysis
Spatial dependence
Spatial descriptive statistics
Spatial distribution
Spatial econometrics
Spatial statistics redirects to Spatial analysis
Spatial variability
Spearman's rank correlation coefficient
Spearman–Brown prediction formula
Species discovery curve
Specification (regression) redirects to Statistical model specification
Specificity (tests)
Spectral clustering – (cluster analysis)
Spectral density
Spectral density estimation
Spectrum bias
Spectrum continuation analysis
Speed prior
Spherical design
Split normal distribution
SPRT redirects to Sequential probability ratio test
SPSS software
SPSS Clementine software (data mining)
Spurious relationship
Square root biased sampling
Squared deviations
St. Petersburg paradox
Stability (probability)
Stable distribution
Stable and tempered stable distributions with volatility clustering – financial applications
Standard deviation
Standard error
Standard normal deviate
Standard normal table
Standard probability space
Standard score
Standardized coefficient
Standardized moment
Standardised mortality rate
Standardized mortality ratio
Standardized rate
Stanine
STAR model a time series model
Star plot redirects to Radar chart
Stata
State space representation
Statgraphics software
Static analysis
Stationary distribution
Stationary ergodic process
Stationary process
Stationary sequence
Stationary subspace analysis
Statistic
STATISTICA software
Statistical arbitrage
Statistical assembly
Statistical assumption
Statistical benchmarking
Statistical classification
Statistical conclusion validity
Statistical consultant
Statistical deviance – see deviance (statistics)
Statistical dispersion
Statistical distance
Statistical efficiency
Statistical epidemiology
Statistical estimation redirects to Estimation theory
Statistical finance
Statistical genetics redirects to population genetics
Statistical geography
Statistical graphics
Statistical hypothesis testing
Statistical independence
Statistical inference
Statistical interference
Statistical Lab software
Statistical learning theory
Statistical literacy
Statistical model
Statistical model specification
Statistical model validation
Statistical noise
Statistical package
Statistical parameter
Statistical parametric mapping
Statistical parsing
Statistical population
Statistical power
Statistical probability
Statistical process control
Statistical proof
Statistical randomness
Statistical range see range (statistics)
Statistical regularity
Statistical relational learning
Statistical sample
Statistical semantics
Statistical shape analysis
Statistical signal processing
Statistical significance
Statistical survey
Statistical syllogism
Statistical theory
Statistical unit
Statisticians' and engineers' cross-reference of statistical terms
Statistics
Statistics education
Statistics Online Computational Resource training materials
StatPlus
StatXact software
Stein's example
Proof of Stein's example
Stein's lemma
Stein's unbiased risk estimate
Steiner system
Stemplot – see Stem-and-leaf display
Step detection
Stepwise regression
Stieltjes moment problem
Stimulus-response model
Stochastic
Stochastic approximation
Stochastic calculus
Stochastic convergence
Stochastic differential equation
Stochastic dominance
Stochastic drift
Stochastic equicontinuity
Stochastic gradient descent
Stochastic grammar
Stochastic investment model
Stochastic kernel estimation
Stochastic matrix
Stochastic modelling (insurance)
Stochastic optimization
Stochastic ordering
Stochastic process
Stochastic rounding
Stochastic simulation
Stopped process
Stopping time
Stratified sampling
Stratonovich integral
Streamgraph
Stress majorization
Strong law of small numbers
Strong prior
Structural break
Structural equation modeling
Structural estimation
Structured data analysis (statistics)
Studentized range
Studentized residual
Student's t-distribution
Student's t-statistic
Student's t-test
Student's t-test for Gaussian scale mixture distributions – see Location testing for Gaussian scale mixture distributions
Studentization
Study design
Study heterogeneity
Subcontrary mean redirects to Harmonic mean
Subgroup analysis
Subindependence
Substitution model
SUDAAN software
Sufficiency (statistics) – see Sufficient statistic
Sufficient dimension reduction
Sufficient statistic
Sum of normally distributed random variables
Sum of squares (disambiguation) general disambiguation
Sum of squares (statistics) – see Partition of sums of squares
Summary statistic
Support curve
Support vector machine
Surrogate model
Survey data collection
Survey sampling
Survey methodology
Survival analysis
Survival rate
Survival function
Survivorship bias
Symmetric design
Symmetric mean absolute percentage error
SYSTAT software
System dynamics
System identification
Systematic error (also see bias (statistics) and errors and residuals in statistics)
Systematic review

T

t-distribution – see Student's t-distribution (includes table)
T distribution (disambiguation)
t-statistic
Tag cloud graphical display of info
Taguchi loss function
Taguchi methods
Tajima's D
Taleb distribution
Tampering (quality control)
Taylor expansions for the moments of functions of random variables
Taylor's law empirical variance-mean relations
Telegraph process
Test for structural change
Test–retest reliability
Test score
Test set
Test statistic
Testimator
Testing hypotheses suggested by the data
Text analytics
The Long Tail possibly seminal magazine article
The Unscrambler software
Theil index
Theil–Sen estimator
Theory of conjoint measurement
Therapeutic effect
Thompson sampling
Three-point estimation
Three-stage least squares
Threshold model
Thurstone scale
Thurstonian model
Time–frequency analysis
Time–frequency representation
Time reversibility
Time series
Time-series regression
Time use survey
Time-varying covariate
Timeline of probability and statistics
TinkerPlots proprietary software for schools
Tobit model
Tolerance interval
Top-coded
Topic model (statistical natural language processing)
Topological data analysis
Tornqvist index
Total correlation
Total least squares
Total sum of squares
Total survey error
Total variation distance a statistical distance measure
TPL Tables software
Tracy–Widom distribution
Traffic equations
Training set
Transect
Transferable belief model
Transiogram
Transition rate matrix
Transmission risks and rates
Treatment and control groups
Trend analysis
Trend estimation
Trend-stationary process
Treynor ratio
Triangular distribution
Trimean
Trimmed estimator
Trispectrum
True experiment
True variance
Truncated distribution
Truncated mean
Truncated normal distribution
Truncated regression model
Truncation (statistics)
Tsallis distribution
Tsallis statistics
Tschuprow's T
Tucker decomposition
Tukey's range test multiple comparisons
Tukey's test of additivity interaction in two-way anova
Tukey–Duckworth test
Tukey–Kramer method
Tukey lambda distribution
Tweedie distribution
Twisting properties
Two stage least squares redirects to Instrumental variable
Two-tailed test
Two-way analysis of variance
Type I and type II errors
Type-1 Gumbel distribution
Type-2 Gumbel distribution
Tyranny of averages

U

u-chart
U-quadratic distribution
U-statistic
U test
Umbrella sampling
Unbiased estimator – see bias (statistics)
Unbiased estimation of standard deviation
Uncertainty
Uncertainty coefficient
Uncertainty quantification
Uncomfortable science
Uncorrelated
Underdispersion redirects to Overdispersion
Underfitting redirects to Overfitting
Underprivileged area score
Unevenly spaced time series
 Unexplained variation – see Explained variation
Uniform distribution (continuous)
Uniform distribution (discrete)
Uniformly most powerful test
Unimodal distribution redirects to Unimodal function (has some stats context)
Unimodality
Unistat software
Unit (statistics)
Unit of observation
Unit root
Unit root test
Unit-weighted regression
Unitized risk
Univariate
Univariate analysis
Univariate distribution
Unmatched count
Unseen species problem
Unsolved problems in statistics
Upper and lower probabilities
Upside potential ratio finance
Urn problem
Ursell function
Utility maximization problem
Utilization distribution

V

Validity (statistics)
Van der Waerden test
Van Houtum distribution
Vapnik–Chervonenkis theory
Varadhan's lemma
Variable
Variable kernel density estimation
Variable-order Bayesian network
Variable-order Markov model
Variable rules analysis
Variance
Variance decomposition of forecast errors
Variance gamma process
Variance inflation factor
Variance-gamma distribution
Variance reduction
Variance-stabilizing transformation
Variance-to-mean ratio
Variation ratio
Variational Bayesian methods
Variational message passing
Variogram
Varimax rotation
Vasicek model
VC dimension
VC theory
Vector autoregression
VEGAS algorithm
Violin plot
ViSta – Software, see ViSta, The Visual Statistics system
Voigt profile
Volatility (finance)
Volcano plot (statistics)
Von Mises distribution
Von Mises–Fisher distribution
V-optimal histograms
V-statistic
Vuong's closeness test
Vysochanskiï–Petunin inequality

W

Wait list control group
Wald distribution redirects to Inverse Gaussian distribution
Wald test
Wald–Wolfowitz runs test
Wallenius' noncentral hypergeometric distribution
Wang and Landau algorithm
Ward's method
Watterson estimator
Watts and Strogatz model
Weibull chart redirects to Weibull distribution
Weibull distribution
Weibull modulus
Weight function
Weighted median
Weighted covariance matrix redirects to Sample mean and sample covariance
Weighted mean
Weighted sample redirects to Sample mean and sample covariance
Welch's method spectral density estimation
Welch's t test
Welch–Satterthwaite equation
Well-behaved statistic
Wick product
Wilks' lambda distribution
Wilks' theorem redirects to section of Likelihood-ratio test
Winsorized mean
Whipple's index
White test
White noise
Wide and narrow data
Wiener deconvolution
Wiener filter
Wiener process
Wigner quasi-probability distribution
Wigner semicircle distribution
Wike's law of low odd primes
Wilcoxon signed-rank test
Will Rogers phenomenon
WinBUGS software
Window function
Winpepi software
Winsorising
Wishart distribution
Wold's theorem
Wombling
Working–Hotelling procedure
World Programming System software
Wrapped Cauchy distribution
Wrapped distribution
Wrapped exponential distribution
Wrapped normal distribution
Wrapped Lévy distribution
Writer invariant

X
X-12-ARIMA
 chart
 and R chart
 and s chart
XLispStat software
XploRe software

Y
Yamartino method
Yates analysis
Yates's correction for continuity
Youden's J statistic
Yule–Simon distribution

Z

z-score
z-factor
z statistic
Z-test
Z-transform
Zakai equation
Zelen's design
Zero degrees of freedom
Zero–one law (disambiguation)
Zeta distribution
Ziggurat algorithm
Zipf–Mandelbrot law a discrete distribution
Zipf's law

See also
 Supplementary lists
These lists include items which are somehow related to statistics however are not included in this index:
 List of statisticians
 List of important publications in statistics
 List of scientific journals in statistics

 Topic lists
 Outline of statistics
 List of probability topics
 Glossary of probability and statistics
 Glossary of experimental design
 Notation in probability and statistics
 List of probability distributions
 List of graphical methods
 List of fields of application of statistics
 List of stochastic processes topics
 Lists of statistics topics
 List of statistical packages

External links
ISI Glossary of Statistical Terms (multilingual), International Statistical Institute

 
Mathematics-related lists
Indexes of business topics
Lists of topics